= The Kamikaze Hunters =

The Kamikaze Hunters: Fighting for the Pacific, 1945
- Author: Will Iredale
- Publisher: Macmillan
- ISBN: 1681774305

The Kamikaze Hunters: Fighting for the Pacific, 1945 is a 2015 book by Will Iredale. It deals with the actions of the Fleet Air Arm of Great Britain's Royal Navy during 1945, in the final stages of World War II in the Pacific theater.
